The arrondissement of Amiens is an arrondissement of France in the Somme department in the Hauts-de-France region. It has 291 communes.

Composition

The communes of the arrondissement of Amiens are:

 Agenville (80005)
 Ailly-sur-Somme (80011)
 Airaines (80013)
 Allonville (80020)
 Amiens (80021)
 Andainville (80022)
 Argœuves (80024)
 Arguel (80026)
 Aubigny (80036)
 Aumâtre (80040)
 Aumont (80041)
 Autheux (80042)
 Authieule (80044)
 Avelesges (80046)
 Avesnes-Chaussoy (80048)
 Bacouel-sur-Selle (80050)
 Baizieux (80052)
 Barly (80055)
 Bavelincourt (80056)
 Béalcourt (80060)
 Beaucamps-le-Jeune (80061)
 Beaucamps-le-Vieux (80062)
 Beaucourt-sur-l'Hallue (80066)
 Beaumetz (80068)
 Beauquesne (80070)
 Beauval (80071)
 Béhencourt (80077)
 Belleuse (80079)
 Belloy-Saint-Léonard (80081)
 Belloy-sur-Somme (80082)
 Bergicourt (80083)
 Bermesnil (80084)
 Bernâtre (80085)
 Bernaville (80086)
 Berneuil (80089)
 Bertangles (80092)
 Berteaucourt-les-Dames (80093)
 Bettembos (80098)
 Bettencourt-Saint-Ouen (80100)
 Blangy-sous-Poix (80106)
 Blangy-Tronville (80107)
 Boisbergues (80108)
 Bonnay (80112)
 Bonneville (80113)
 Bosquel (80114)
 Bouchon (80117)
 Bougainville (80119)
 Bouquemaison (80122)
 Bourdon (80123)
 Bovelles (80130)
 Boves (80131)
 Brassy (80134)
 Breilly (80137)
 Bresle (80138)
 Brévillers (80140)
 Briquemesnil-Floxicourt (80142)
 Brocourt (80143)
 Bussy-lès-Daours (80156)
 Bussy-lès-Poix (80157)
 Cachy (80159)
 Cagny (80160)
 Camon (80164)
 Camps-en-Amiénois (80165)
 Canaples (80166)
 Candas (80168)
 Cannessières (80169)
 Cardonnette (80173)
 Caulières (80179)
 Cavillon (80180)
 Cerisy (80184)
 Cerisy-Buleux (80183)
 La Chaussée-Tirancourt (80187)
 Chipilly (80192)
 Clairy-Saulchoix (80198)
 Coisy (80202)
 Contay (80207)
 Conteville (80208)
 Contre (80210)
 Conty (80211)
 Corbie (80212)
 Courcelles-sous-Moyencourt (80218)
 Courcelles-sous-Thoix (80219)
 Creuse (80225)
 Croixrault (80227)
 Crouy-Saint-Pierre (80229)
 Daours (80234)
 Domart-en-Ponthieu (80241)
 Domesmont (80243)
 Domléger-Longvillers (80245)
 Doullens (80253)
 Dreuil-lès-Amiens (80256)
 Dromesnil (80259)
 Dury (80261)
 Épaumesnil (80269)
 Épécamps (80270)
 Éplessier (80273)
 Équennes-Éramecourt (80276)
 Essertaux (80285)
 Estrées-sur-Noye (80291)
 L'Étoile (80296)
 Étréjust (80297)
 Famechon (80301)
 Ferrières (80305)
 Fieffes-Montrelet (80566)
 Fienvillers (80310)
 Flesselles (80316)
 Fleury (80317)
 Flixecourt (80318)
 Fluy (80319)
 Fontaine-le-Sec (80324)
 Forceville-en-Vimeu (80330)
 Fossemanant (80334)
 Foucaucourt-Hors-Nesle (80336)
 Fouilloy (80338)
 Fourcigny (80340)
 Fourdrinoy (80341)
 Framicourt (80343)
 Franqueville (80346)
 Fransu (80348)
 Franvillers (80350)
 Fréchencourt (80351)
 Frémontiers (80352)
 Fresnes-Tilloloy (80354)
 Fresneville (80355)
 Fresnoy-Andainville (80356)
 Fresnoy-au-Val (80357)
 Frettecuisse (80361)
 Fricamps (80365)
 Frohen-sur-Authie (80369)
 Gauville (80375)
 Gentelles (80376)
 Gézaincourt (80377)
 Glisy (80379)
 Gorges (80381)
 Grattepanche (80387)
 Grouches-Luchuel (80392)
 Guignemicourt (80399)
 Guizancourt (80402)
 Halloy-lès-Pernois (80408)
 Le Hamel (80411)
 Hamelet (80412)
 Hangest-sur-Somme (80416)
 Havernas (80423)
 Hébécourt (80424)
 Heilly (80426)
 Hem-Hardinval (80427)
 Hénencourt (80429)
 Hescamps (80436)
 Heucourt-Croquoison (80437)
 Heuzecourt (80439)
 Hiermont (80440)
 Hornoy-le-Bourg (80443)
 Humbercourt (80445)
 Inval-Boiron (80450)
 Lachapelle (80455)
 Lafresguimont-Saint-Martin (80456)
 Lahoussoye (80458)
 Laleu (80459)
 Lamaronde (80460)
 Lamotte-Brebière (80461)
 Lamotte-Warfusée (80463)
 Lanches-Saint-Hilaire (80466)
 Lignières-Châtelain (80479)
 Lignières-en-Vimeu (80480)
 Liomer (80484)
 Longueau (80489)
 Longuevillette (80491)
 Lucheux (80495)
 Maizicourt (80503)
 Marcelcave (80507)
 Marlers (80515)
 Le Mazis (80522)
 Meigneux (80525)
 Le Meillard (80526)
 Méréaucourt (80528)
 Méricourt-en-Vimeu (80531)
 Méricourt-l'Abbé (80530)
 Le Mesge (80535)
 Métigny (80543)
 Mézerolles (80544)
 Mirvaux (80550)
 Molliens-au-Bois (80553)
 Molliens-Dreuil (80554)
 Monsures (80558)
 Montagne-Fayel (80559)
 Montigny-les-Jongleurs (80563)
 Montigny-sur-l'Hallue (80562)
 Montonvillers (80565)
 Morcourt (80569)
 Morvillers-Saint-Saturnin (80573)
 Mouflières (80575)
 Moyencourt-lès-Poix (80577)
 Namps-Maisnil (80582)
 Nampty (80583)
 Naours (80584)
 Nesle-l'Hôpital (80586)
 Neslette (80587)
 Neuville-au-Bois (80591)
 Neuville-Coppegueule (80592)
 Neuvillette (80596)
 Occoches (80602)
 Ô-de-Selle (80485)
 Offignies (80604)
 Oisemont (80606)
 Oissy (80607)
 Oresmaux (80611)
 Outrebois (80614)
 Pernois (80619)
 Picquigny (80622)
 Pierregot (80624)
 Pissy (80626)
 Plachy-Buyon (80627)
 Poix-de-Picardie (80630)
 Pont-de-Metz (80632)
 Pont-Noyelles (80634)
 Poulainville (80639)
 Prouville (80642)
 Prouzel (80643)
 Querrieu (80650)
 Le Quesne (80651)
 Quesnoy-sur-Airaines (80655)
 Quevauvillers (80656)
 Rainneville (80661)
 Rambures (80663)
 Remaisnil (80666)
 Remiencourt (80668)
 Revelles (80670)
 Ribeaucourt (80671)
 Ribemont-sur-Ancre (80672)
 Riencourt (80673)
 Rivery (80674)
 Rubempré (80686)
 Rumigny (80690)
 Sailly-Laurette (80693)
 Sailly-le-Sec (80694)
 Sains-en-Amiénois (80696)
 Saint-Acheul (80697)
 Saint-Aubin-Montenoy (80698)
 Saint-Aubin-Rivière (80699)
 Sainte-Segrée (80719)
 Saint-Fuscien (80702)
 Saint-Germain-sur-Bresle (80703)
 Saint-Gratien (80704)
 Saint-Léger-lès-Domart (80706)
 Saint-Léger-sur-Bresle (80707)
 Saint-Maulvis (80709)
 Saint-Ouen (80711)
 Saint-Sauflieu (80717)
 Saint-Sauveur (80718)
 Saint-Vaast-en-Chaussée (80722)
 Saisseval (80723)
 Saleux (80724)
 Salouël (80725)
 Saulchoy-sous-Poix (80728)
 Saveuse (80730)
 Senarpont (80732)
 Sentelie (80734)
 Seux (80735)
 Soues (80738)
 Surcamps (80742)
 Tailly (80744)
 Talmas (80746)
 Terramesnil (80749)
 Thézy-Glimont (80752)
 Thieulloy-l'Abbaye (80754)
 Thieulloy-la-Ville (80755)
 Thoix (80757)
 Le Translay (80767)
 Treux (80769)
 Vadencourt (80773)
 Vaire-sous-Corbie (80774)
 Vauchelles-lès-Domart (80778)
 Vaux-en-Amiénois (80782)
 Vaux-sur-Somme (80784)
 Vecquemont (80785)
 Velennes (80786)
 Vergies (80788)
 Vers-sur-Selle (80791)
 Vignacourt (80793)
 La Vicogne (80792)
 Ville-le-Marclet (80795)
 Villeroy (80796)
 Villers-Bocage (80798)
 Villers-Bretonneux (80799)
 Villers-Campsart (80800)
 Vraignes-lès-Hornoy (80813)
 Wargnies (80819)
 Warloy-Baillon (80820)
 Warlus (80821)
 Woirel (80828)
 Yzeux (80835)

History

The arrondissement of Amiens was created in 1800. In January 2009 the canton of Oisemont passed from the arrondissement of Amiens to the arrondissement of Abbeville. At the January 2017 reorganisation of the arrondissements of Somme, it received 38 communes from the arrondissement of Abbeville and seven communes from the arrondissement of Péronne, and it lost two communes to the arrondissement of Abbeville, five communes to the arrondissement of Montdidier and 26 communes to the arrondissement of Péronne.

As a result of the reorganisation of the cantons of France which came into effect in 2015, the borders of the cantons are no longer related to the borders of the arrondissements. The cantons of the arrondissement of Amiens were, as of January 2015:

 Acheux-en-Amiénois
 Amiens-1 (Ouest)
 Amiens-2 (Nord-Ouest)
 Amiens-3 (Nord-Est)
 Amiens-4 (Est)
 Amiens-5 (Sud-Est)
 Amiens-6 (Sud)
 Amiens-7 (Sud-Ouest)
 Amiens-8 (Nord)
 Bernaville
 Boves
 Conty
 Corbie
 Domart-en-Ponthieu
 Doullens
 Hornoy-le-Bourg
 Molliens-Dreuil
 Picquigny
 Poix-de-Picardie
 Villers-Bocage

References

Amiens